The equestrian events at the 1956 Summer Olympics were held in Stockholm due to the Australian quarantine regulations and included dressage, eventing, and show jumping. All three disciplines had both individual and team competitions. The competitions were held from 11 to 17 June 1956 at Stockholm Olympic Stadium. There were 158 entries from 29 countries: Argentina, Australia, Austria, Belgium, Brazil, Bulgaria, Cambodia, Canada, Denmark, Egypt, Finland, France, Germany, Great Britain, Hungary, Ireland, Italy, Japan, Netherlands, Norway, Portugal, Romania, Soviet Union, Spain, Sweden, Switzerland, Turkey, USA and Venezuela. This would be the first appearance for Australia, Cambodia and Venezuela in equestrian events.

Although Melbourne was awarded the 1956 Olympic Games, Australia had a strict six-month pre-shipment quarantine on horses. A meeting in 1953 by Australian federal authorities ruled that they would not change the quarantine laws for the Olympic horses. Therefore, the equestrian competition would not be able to be held in Australia. In 1954, the IOC selected Stockholm, Sweden as the alternate venue for the equestrian events. Therefore, the equestrian events were not only separated by city or country, but also continent, with the equestrian event being held in June (summer in the Northern Hemisphere) and the other sports held in November (late spring in the Southern Hemisphere).

Disciplines

Show jumping
A total of 66 riders from 24 countries contested the difficult Greger Lewnhaupt-designed course, which no one was able to ride clear in the first round. Considered the first modern course in Olympic history, it was 775 meters in length, to be ridden at 400m/min, with 14 obstacles and 17 jumping efforts. The gold medal was awarded to Hans Günter Winkler of the Federal Republic of Germany, on his great mare Halla. He finished the first round with 4 faults, after landing heavily after an early takeoff by his mount, resulting in a pulled groin muscle. Knowing that withdrawal from the final round would result in his country's elimination, Winkler rode in the second round, and managed to complete it faultlessly. Winkler would go on to be one of the most medal-winning riders in Olympic history, with 7 medals to his name.

Dressage
36 riders, 11 of which were women, from 17 nations competed in dressage. Of those 11 women, 2 won an individual medal (including previous silver medalist Lis Hartel) and another placed in the top 10. There was controversy in the judging, since judges tended to have their own opinions of what was considered correct training and riding, and at the time there was no common ideal for dressage. The German and Swedish judges favored their own countrymen, and ended up being suspended by the FEI. Following this controversy, the IOC threatened to remove dressage from the Olympics. The FEI and IOC came to a compromise, resulting in only individual competitors being allowed at the 1960 Games, with up to 2 riders per country.

Eventing

Medal summary

Participating nations
A total of 29 nations competed in Stockholm.  

Five nations competed in the equestrian events in Stockholm, but did not attend the Games in Melbourne:
 
  
 
  
 

Egypt and Cambodia did not compete in Melbourne due to the Suez Crisis, whilst Netherlands, Spain and Switzerland all boycotted the Australian event in protest at the Soviet invasion of Hungary.

Medal table

Key
 Host nation (Sweden)

Officials
Appointment of officials was as follows:

Dressage
  Gaston de Trannoy (Ground Jury President)
  Gen. Berger (Ground Jury Member)
  Sven Colliander (Ground Jury Member)
  Eduardo Yanez (Ground Jury Member)
  Col. Fog (Ground Jury Member)

Jumping
  José M. Cavanillas (Ground Jury President)
  Pierre Clavé (Ground Jury Member)
  Col. Djerasimovic (Ground Jury Member)
  Bruno Bruni (Ground Jury Member)
  Philip Bowden-Smith (Ground Jury Member)
  Greger Lewenhaupt (Course Designer)
  Alex Pantschoulidzev (Technical Delegate)

Eventing
  Ranieri di Campello (Ground Jury President)
  Arthur Kalita (Ground Jury Member)
  V.D.S. Williams (Ground Jury Member)
  José M. Cavanillas (Ground Jury Member)
  Arne Kristensen (Ground Jury Member)
  Björn Strandell (Course Designer)
  Pierre Beauduin (Technical Delegate)

References

External links
 International Olympic Committee medal database

 
1956 Summer Olympics events
1956
International sports competitions in Stockholm
1956 in Swedish sport
Olympic Games in Sweden
1956 in equestrian
Equestrian sports competitions in Sweden
June 1956 sports events in Europe
1950s in Stockholm